Joanne Michèle Sylvie Harris  (born 3 July 1964) is an English-French author, best known for her novel Chocolat (1999), which was adapted the following year for the film Chocolat.

Early life
Harris was born in Barnsley, Yorkshire, to an English father and a French mother. Both of her parents were teachers of modern languages and literature at a local grammar school. Her first language was French, which caused divisions between her English family, where nobody spoke French, and her French family, where nobody spoke English. Both families had turbulent histories and a tradition of strong women, kitchen gardening, storytelling, folklore and cookery..

Career
Harris began writing at an early age. She was strongly influenced by Grimms' Fairy Tales and Charles Perrault's work, as well as local folklore and Norse mythology. She was educated at Wakefield Girls' High School, Barnsley Sixth Form College, and St Catharine's College, Cambridge, where she studied modern and mediaeval languages.

After a single, unsuccessful year as an accountant, which she describes as "like being trapped in a Terry Gilliam movie", she trained as a teacher at the University of Sheffield, and for 15 years she taught modern languages, mostly at Leeds Grammar School, a boys' independent school in Yorkshire. She also taught at Sheffield University, lecturing on aspects of French literature and film. During this period she worked on a number of book projects; The Evil Seed, Sleep, Pale Sister and Chocolat were published while she was still teaching.

Her first novel, The Evil Seed, was published in 1989, with only limited success. A second novel, Sleep, Pale Sister, shows the way in which her style developed from horror-pastiche to literary ghost story. In 1999 her third novel, Chocolat, a darkly magical modern folk-tale, thematically based on food and set in the Gers region of France, reached number 1 in the Sunday Times bestseller list. The book won the Creative Freedom Award in 1999 and was shortlisted for the 1999 Whitbread Novel of the Year Award. The film rights were sold to David Brown and developed by Miramax Pictures. The success of the motion picture, starring Juliette Binoche and Johnny Depp, brought Harris worldwide recognition, and in 2012 she became one of only four female members of the "Millionaires Club", the elite group of authors who have achieved a million sales of a single book in the UK since records began.

Since Chocolat, all of Harris's books have been UK bestsellers. Her wide-ranging choice of subject matter means that her work often defies categorization, and she has a predilection for difficult or challenging issues. She has written three more novels in the Chocolat series, continuing the adventures of Vianne Rocher; The Lollipop Shoes (titled The Girl With No Shadow in the US), Peaches for Monsieur le Curé (Peaches for Father Francis in the US), and The Strawberry Thief – published 4 April 2019, as well as three French cookbooks (co-written with Fran Warde), two collections of short stories and a number of dark psychological thrillers, including Gentlemen and Players, Different Class and Blueeyedboy.

In August 2007, she published Runemarks, a mythpunk/fantasy novel based on Norse mythology, aimed at both children and adults. The sequel, Runelight, was published in 2011, and since then the Rune books have acquired an enthusiastic following alongside the fans of Vianne Rocher.  Continuing the Norse mythology theme, The Gospel of Loki was published in February 2014, with The Testament of Loki coming out in 2017. These books continue the tale of the rise and fall of the gods of Asgard from the point of view of Loki the trickster.

In 2011, she contributed a short story, Never Cut A Hawthorn, to Why Willows Weepan anthology which supports the Woodland Trust. This is only one of the many stories she has contributed to charity anthologies.

She has also published three novellas – A Pocketful of Crows, The Blue Salt Road, and Orfeia, all loosely based on Child Ballads – which were illustrated by Bonnie Helen Hawkins, and in 2021, Honeycomb, a collection of original fairytales, illustrated by Charles Vess. She has also authored three cookbooks.

She is currently Chair of the Society of Authors, and sits on the Board of the Authors' Licensing and Collecting Society.

She is a patron of the charities Médecins Sans Frontières (Doctors Without Borders) and Plan UK, and has travelled to Togo and to the Congo to report on their work. An account of her visit to the Congo was published in Writing on the Edge, a collection of essays by noted literary figures, with photographs by Tom Craig, in 2010. She has also donated short stories for inclusion in anthologies published by a number of charities, notably Piggybank Kids, the Woodland Trust, the Stop Climate Chaos Coalition and Breast Cancer UK. In 2021, Harris was a guest on BBC's Desert Island Discs and talked openly about her diagnosis and ongoing treatment of her breast cancer in 2020. She also suffers from seasonal affective disorder.

Media
Harris was a guest on the long-running BBC Radio 4 programme, Desert Island Discs in November 2021.

Recurrent themes
Some of Harris's recurrent themes are issues of identity, mother/child relationships, the emotional resonance of food, the magic and horror of everyday things, the outsider in the community, faith and superstition, and the joy of small pleasures. She has spoken out against entrenched sexism in the literary field, and she has discussed how she weaves a critique of sexist attitudes into her fiction:

Her writing style focuses on the senses, especially those of taste and smell. This may be due to the fact that Harris has a form of synaesthesia, in which she experiences colours as scents.
Her novels are often much darker than the film adaptation of Chocolat would lead us to suppose, and characters are often emotionally damaged or morally ambivalent. Father-figures are frequently absent, and mothers are often portrayed as controlling, harsh or even abusive, as in Blueeyedboy and Five-Quarters of the Orange. Harris favours a first-person, dual-narrator narrative structure, often revisiting past events to cast light on current developments. This generally makes for complex characterisation, and even minor characters are often unusually well developed. Her books have a very strong sense of place, with settings that play as significant a role as do the characters themselves.

The fictional French village of Lansquenet-sous-Tannes, the setting of Chocolat and Peaches for Monsieur le Curé, also features in Blackberry Wine, and the fictional Yorkshire village of Malbry is the setting for both Blueeyedboy and Gentlemen and Players, as well as numerous short stories. Malbry is also the name of Maddy's home in the Rune books, and seems to bear a certain resemblance to Harris's home village of Almondbury.

Honours and awards
Harris was appointed Member of the Order of the British Empire (MBE) in the 2013 Birthday Honours and Officer of the Order of the British Empire (OBE) in the 2022 Birthday Honours for services to literature.

Harris is the holder of honorary doctorates in literature from the University of Huddersfield and the University of Sheffield, and is an Honorary Fellow of St Catharine's College, Cambridge.
In 2022, she was made a Fellow of the Royal Society of Literature.

In 2017, she won a Fragrance Foundation Jasmine Award for perfume journalism.

Harris's books are now published in over fifty countries and have won a number of UK and international awards, including:
Chocolat: Creative Freedom Award (2000); Whittaker Gold Award (2001). Shortlisted: Whitbread Novel of the Year Award (2000), Scripter Award (2001); film version nominated for 8 BAFTAs and 5 Oscars. Whittaker Platinum Award (2012).
Blackberry Wine: 2000 Winner of both the Foreign and International categories of the Salon du Livre Gourmand (France).
Five-Quarters of the Orange: Shortlisted: 2002 RNA Novel of the Year; Author of the Year 2002; WHSmith Award 2002 (UK).
The French Kitchen: (a cookbook with Fran Warde): 2005 Winner of the Golden Ladle for Best Recipe Book (softcover) in the World Food Media Awards.
Gentlemen & Players: Shortlisted for the Edgar Award, 2007 (USA) and the Grand Prix du Polar de Cognac (France).
Flavours of Childhood: (a piece co-written for the BBC Radio 4 series First Taste with poet Sean O'Brien) Winner of the Glenfiddich Award, 2006.

Personal life
Harris is married and has a son Fred, who came out as transgender in 2022. She lives in Almondbury, Yorkshire with her husband, Kevin. She works from a shed in her back garden, which she chose to take as her luxury item on Desert Island Discs.

Bibliography 
The Evil Seed (1989)
Sleep, Pale Sister (1993)
Chocolat (1999)
Blackberry Wine (2000)
Five-Quarters of the Orange (2001)
The French Kitchen, A Cook Book (2002)
Coastliners (2002)
Holy Fools (2003)
Jigs & Reels (2004)
Gentlemen & Players (2005)
The French Market (2005)
The Lollipop Shoes (2007) (US title: The Girl With No Shadow, April 2008)
Runemarks (2007 in the UK, 2008 in the US)
Blueeyedboy (1 April 2010 in the UK)
Runelight (September 2011 in the UK)
Peaches for Monsieur le Curé (May 2012) (US title: Peaches for Father Francis, October 2012)
A Cat, a Hat and a Piece of String (October 2012)
The Gospel of Loki (February 2014), as Joanne M. Harris
The Little Book of Chocolat (March 2014), with Fran Warde
The Loneliness of the Long-Distance Time Traveller (October 2014). Doctor Who novella.
Different Class (2016)
A Pocketful of Crows (2017) a folklore-inspired novella
The Testament of Loki (2018)
The Blue Salt Road (2018)
The Strawberry Thief (2019)
Orfeia (2020)
 Ten Things About Writing(2020) a self-help book for writers.
Honeycomb (2021)
A Narrow Door (2021)

Stories featured in the following anthologies: 
Magic (2002). A collection of stories in aid of Piggybank Kids.
Bosom Buddies (2003). A collection of stories in aid of Breast Cancer UK.
Journey to the Sea (2005). A collection of stories in aid of Piggybank Kids.
Mums – a Celebration of Motherhood (2006). A collection of stories in aid of Piggybank Kids.
Dads – a Celebration of Fatherhood (2007). A collection in aid of Piggybank Kids.
In Bed With... (2009). A collection of erotic stories by well-known female writers.
Because I am a Girl (2010). Charity anthology in aid of Plan UK.
Stories (2010). A collection of fantasy tales, edited by Neil Gaiman and Al Sarrantonio.
Writing on the Edge (2010). A collection of eyewitness accounts by well-known authors of extreme conditions and war-torn locations. In aid of MSF.
Why Willows Weep (2011). Charity anthology in aid of the Woodland Trust.
Beacons (2013). Charity anthology in aid of the Stop Climate Chaos Coalition.
Fearie Tales (2014)
That Glimpse of Truth – the 100 Finest Short Stories Ever Written (2014), edited by David Miller.
Time Trips (2015). A collection of Doctor Who stories by various authors, including the Joanne Harris novella The Loneliness of the Long-Distance Time Traveller.

References

External links 

The Joanne Harris Website
RED interview
Norse Mythology Blog interview with Joanne Harris: Part 1, 2, 3, 4, 5
Authors at Transworld
Authortrek interview with Kevin Patrick Mahoney
Guardian feature, July 2001
 Joanne Harris: The sensuality of language is not that different from the sensuality of food, Interviews with exceptional minds, Eximia 

1964 births
20th-century British short story writers
20th-century English novelists
20th-century English women writers
21st-century British short story writers
21st-century English novelists
21st-century English women writers
Academics of the University of Sheffield
Alumni of St Catharine's College, Cambridge
British women short story writers
English fantasy writers
English people of French descent
English women novelists
Living people
Magic realism writers
Officers of the Order of the British Empire
People from Barnsley
Women science fiction and fantasy writers